{{DISPLAYTITLE:C22H28N2O3}}
The molecular formula C22H28N2O3 may refer to:

 Hirsutine
 Isovoacangine
 JTE 7-31
 18-Methoxycoronaridine
 Pentamorphone
 Voacangine

Molecular formulas